Homoeotricha omnistellata is a species of tephritid or fruit flies in the genus Homoeotricha of the family Tephritidae.

Distribution
Nepal.

References

Tephritinae
Insects described in 2011
Diptera of Asia